USS Van Buren (PG-150/PF-42), a  patrol frigate, was the second ship of the United States Navy to hold this name. The first Van Buren, a revenue cutter, was named for President Martin Van Buren; the second Van Buren honors Van Buren, Arkansas.

Construction
Van Buren, originally classified as patrol gunboat PG-150 and reclassified a patrol frigate 15 April 1943, was laid down under a Maritime Commission (MARCOM) contract, MC hull 1453, on 24 June 1943, at the Consolidated Steel Corporation shipyard in Wilmington, California; launched on 27 July 1943, sponsored by Mrs. Edward J. O'Hara; and commissioned at Terminal Island, on 17 December 1943.

Service history
Van Buren conducted shakedown testing off the US west coast before departing San Pedro, California, on 9 March 1944, bound for the western Pacific. She sailed in company with her sister ship , escorting the merchant tanker SS Fort Erie to Espiritu Santo from 23 to 29 March. Departing that port on 30 March, she arrived at Milne Bay, New Guinea, on 2 April.

On 21 April, Vice Admiral Marc Mitscher's task force of aircraft carriers, battleships, cruisers and destroyers began pounding Japanese airfields and defensive positions on Hollandia, Wakde Airfield, Sawar Airfield and Sarmi, Western New Guinea, to neutralize them during an impending amphibious operation under the command of Rear Admiral Daniel E. Barbey. The next day, Army troops began landing at Aitape and Humboldt Bay. Van Buren escorted convoys supporting this operation into May and June.

As Army forces encountered enemy resistance ashore, naval units were often called on for gunfire support. Van Buren received such a request on the afternoon of 9 June. At 1740, the patrol frigate opened with her main battery, firing salvoes at Japanese troop concentrations near a road in the Sarmi-Sawar sector. Ten days later, the warship again provided gunfire support for the Army near Maffin Village. Lying just off the beach, Van Buren demolished her targets and started many fires. An Army plane again provided call-fire guidance on 23 June, when Van Buren once more supported Army troops struggling against the Japanese defenders, breaking up troop concentrations and destroying communications and supplies.

Van Buren subsequently screened the ships supporting the Cape Sansapor operations in August, and continued escort operations into autumn. On 10 November, Van Buren departed Humboldt Bay, bound for Cape Sansapor with a convoy of four LSTs (and ). They altered course and used the ship's motor whaleboat to rescue the aircraft's crew, unhurt.

One week later, during operations in the Philippines, Van Buren went to general quarters when  radioed contact with an unidentified plane closing on their vicinity. Although ready for action, the frigate did not get a chance to engage, as the plane veered away and passed along the opposite side of the convoy, well beyond gun range.

Van Buren continued her convoy escort and screening duties with the 7th Amphibious Force in the Philippines, into late 1944.  After escorting a convoy to Leyte in mid-December, Van Buren sailed via Manus, in the Admiralties, to Hawaii. Arriving at Pearl Harbor on 2 January 1945, Van Buren operated as a training ship attached to the U.S. Pacific Fleet's destroyer forces through the spring of 1945. Shifting to the west coast of the United States, soon thereafter, the patrol vessel arrived at San Francisco, on 2 July. Assigned to Commander, Western Sea Frontier, Van Buren was fitted out as a weather ship and served in that capacity through the end of hostilities with Japan and into the year 1946.

Departing San Francisco, on 13 March 1946, Van Buren transited the Panama Canal, and arrived at Charleston, South Carolina, on 3 April. Decommissioned there on 6 May 1946, Van Buren was struck from the Navy List on 19 June 1946, and sold soon thereafter to the Sun Shipbuilding and Drydock Company of Chester, Pennsylvania, for scrapping.

Awards
Van Buren received three battle stars for World War II service.

References

Bibliography

External links 
 
hazegray.org: USS Van Buren

Tacoma-class frigates
World War II patrol vessels of the United States
Ships built in Los Angeles
1943 ships
Weather ships